Ogarkovskaya is a rural locality (a village) in Tiginskoye Rural Settlement, Vozhegodsky District, Vologda Oblast, Russia. The population was 74 as of 2002.

Geography 
Ogarkovskaya is located 30 km northwest of Vozhega (the district's administrative centre) by road. Bukhara is the nearest rural locality.

References 

Rural localities in Vozhegodsky District